In the spring of 542, at the Battle of Faventia (modern Faenza), an Ostrogothic army under king Totila scattered the larger Roman forces of generals Constantian and Alexander, beginning the resurgence of Gothic resistance to the Roman reconquest of Italy. Before the battle, Valaris, a gigantic Goth, challenged any Roman to do single combat with him. Valaris was slain by the Byzantine soldier Artabazes, who was also mortally wounded.

Battle
The key moment during the battle, was, according to Procopius, when the Roman rear was violently attacked by some 300 men of the Ostrogothic cavalry.

References

Sources
 

542
Faventia
Faventia
Faventia
Gothic War (535–554)
540s in the Byzantine Empire
Faventia